In mathematics, the Weinstein–Aronszajn identity  states that if  and  are matrices of size  and  respectively (either or both of which may be infinite) then,
provided  (and hence, also ) is of trace class,

where  is the  identity matrix.

It is closely related to the matrix determinant lemma and its generalization. It is the determinant analogue of the Woodbury matrix identity for matrix inverses.

Proof
The identity may be proved as follows. 

Because  is invertible, the formula for the determinant of a block matrix gives

Because  is invertible, the formula for the determinant of a block matrix gives

Thus

Substituting  for  then gives the Weinstein–Aronszajn identity.

Applications
Let . The identity can be used to show the somewhat more general statement that

 

This identity is useful in developing a Bayes estimator for multivariate Gaussian distributions.

The identity also finds applications in random matrix theory by relating determinants of large matrices to determinants of smaller ones.

References

Determinants
Matrix theory
Theorems in linear algebra